Romerito (born 1960) is a Paraguayan football midfielder.

Romerito may also refer to:

Romerito (footballer, born 1975), Brazilian football striker
Romerito (footballer, born 1977), Spanish football defensive midfielder and manager

See also
Romeritos, Mexican dish of tender sprigs of seepweed